Walter Müller (31 December 1930 – 21 May 2021) was a German gymnast. He competed in eight events at the 1952 Summer Olympics, representing Saar.

See also
 Saar at the 1952 Summer Olympics

References

External links
 

1930 births
2021 deaths
German male artistic gymnasts
Olympic gymnasts of Saar
Gymnasts at the 1952 Summer Olympics
Sportspeople from Neunkirchen, Saarland